Varang Nord is a heavy metal band from Latvia formed in 2014. The band cites Turisas, Amon Amarth and Finntroll as their biggest influences.

History 

In 2019 Varang Nord won the Wacken Metal Battle competition.

Their fourth studio album Pārķiuņa uomurs ("Thunder's Hammer") was released on 23 February 2021, and is fully sung in Latgalian. The album's orchestral arrangements were done by composer Yuri Borin, while Sergey Karshev wrote the bass parts and Alyona Fomina plays the bagpipes and talharpa. 

In the end of 2020, Varang Nord announced a 2021 Heathen Heroes Tour in September with concerts in Czech Republic, Poland, Lithuania, Latvia, Estonia and Finland, featuring Týr, Arkona, Dalriada and Varmia.

In 2021 their album "Pārķiuņa Uomurs" was nominated as 'Global Metal Release Of The Year', it finished joint 7th with the album "A Legacy Of Vengeance" by the Falkland Islands death metal band Bloodrust. The band themselves were nominated 'Breakthrough European Band' and finished 10th.

Members 
Current members
 Jeļena Kaļniša — accordion, vocals (2014–present)
 Danila Lopuha — bass guitar (2017–present)
 Maksims Popovs — electric guitar, vocals (2014–present)
 Aigars Zeiza — drums (2015–present)
 Vjačeslavs Janens — percussions (2017–present)

Former members
 Artjoms Kuricins — bass guitar (2014–2016)
 Jaroslavs Sokolovs — electric guitar (2014–2017)

Discography 
Fire of the North (2014; EP)
Master of the Forest (2015)
Call of Battle (2016; EP)
Call of Battle (2017)
Pārķiuņa uomurs (2021)

References

External links
 

Latvian heavy metal musical groups
Latvian folk metal musical groups
Musical groups established in 2014
Wacken Metal Battle winners
2014 establishments in Latvia